Lucky Willie Bhembe (born 25 October 1973) is a Swazi athlete. He competed at the 2000 Summer Olympics.

Achievements

References

1973 births
Living people
Swazi male long-distance runners
Athletes (track and field) at the 2000 Summer Olympics
Olympic athletes of Eswatini
Swazi male marathon runners